The year 1899 in art involved some significant events.

Events
 December 15 – Glasgow School of Art opens its new building, the most notable work of Charles Rennie Mackintosh.
 Camille Pissarro takes an apartment overlooking the Tuileries Garden in Paris and produces a series of paintings of the view.

Works

 José Ferraz de Almeida Júnior – Saudade
 Wilhelm Amberg – Lost in  Thoughts (approx. date)
 Ottó Baditz – Women in the Prison
 Louis-Ernest Barrias – Nature Unveiling Herself Before Science
 George Edwin Bissell – Statue of Chester A. Arthur (bronze, New York City)
 Pierre Bonnard – Little Girl with a Cat
 Léon Bonnat – Marie Georgine de Ligne
 Jules Dalou – Monument à Alphand (Paris)
 Thomas Eakins
 Portrait of Mary Adeline Williams (first version)
 Wrestlers
 Jean Leon Gerome Ferris – Signing the Mayflower Compact
 Daniel Chester French and Edward Clark Potter – Equestrian statue of Ulysses S. Grant
 Paul Gauguin – Two Tahitian Women
 J. W. Godward
 The Bouquet
 The Delphic Oracle
 The Mirror
 The Signal
 William Harnett – Violin
 Winslow Homer – The Gulf Stream
 William Holman Hunt – The Miracle of the Holy Fire
 Peder Severin Krøyer – Summer evening by Skagen's beach: Artist and his wife
 Constantin Meunier – The Horse at the Pond (Brussels)
 Claude Monet – Charing Cross Bridge (Thyssen-Bornemisza Museum, Madrid)
 Edvard Munch – The Dance of Life
 John F. Peto – Still life with Mug, Pipe and Book
 Maurice Prendergast – Splash of Sunshine and Rain
 Mykola Pymonenko – A Victim of Fanaticism
 Lionel Royer  -Vercingetorix Throws Down His Arms at the Feet of Julius Caesar
 John Singer Sargent – The Wyndham Sisters
 Vardges Sureniants – After the Massacre
 Leon Wyczółkowski – Irena Solska
 W. L. Wyllie – The Battle of the Nile

Births
 January 20
 Pierre Gandon, French illustrator and engraver of postage stamps (died 1990)
 Clarice Cliff, English ceramic artist (died 1972)
 February 15
 Lillian Disney, American artist and wife of Walt Disney (died 1997)
 Grethe Jürgens, German painter (died 1981)
 February 22 – Dechko Uzunov, Bulgarian painter (died 1986)
 March 20 – G. David Thompson, American industrialist and collector of modern art (died 1965)
 April 3 – Borislav Bogdanović, Serbian portraitist (died 1970)
 April 27 – Walter Lantz, American cartoonist and animator (died 1994)
 May 22
 Kosta Hakman, Serbian painter (died 1961)
 Pan Yuliang, Chinese-born painter (died 1977)
 June 2 – Lotte Reiniger, German silhouette animator and film director (died 1981)
 June 12 – Anni Albers, born Annelise Fleischmann, German-born textile artist and printmaker (died 1994)
 July 3 – Else Halling, Norwegian tapestry weaver (died 1987)
 July 16 – Božidar Jakac, Slovene painter and graphic artist (died 1989)
 August 10 – Margarete Heymann, German-born ceramic artist (died 1990)
 August 19 – Bradley Walker Tomlin, American painter (died 1955)
 September 9 – Brassaï, Hungarian photographer, sculptor, and filmmaker (died 1984)
 September 24 – William Dobell, Australian sculptor and painter (died 1970)
 December 4 – Elfriede Lohse-Wächtler, German avant-garde painter (euthanized 1940)
 December 25 – Raphael Soyer, Russian-born American painter (died 1987)

Deaths
 January 29 – Alfred Sisley, French Impressionist painter (born 1839)
 January 30 – Harry Bates, English sculptor (born 1850)
 March 27 – Myles Birket Foster, English illustrator and watercolour painter (born 1825)
 May 25 – Rosa Bonheur, French painter (born 1822)
 July 29 – Adolf Schreyer, German painter (born 1828)
 August 22 – Caspar Buberl, American sculptor (born 1834)
 November 13 – José Ferraz de Almeida Júnior, Brazilian painter (born 1850)
 December 7 – Juan Luna, Filipino painter (born 1857)
 December 23 – Dominique Antoine Magaud, French painter (born 1817)
 date unknown – François Salle, French realist painter (born 1839)

References

 
Years of the 19th century in art
1890s in art